Gianfranco Dalla Barba (born 11 June 1957) is an Italian fencer. He won a gold medal in the team sabre at the 1984 Summer Olympics and a bronze in the same event at the 1988 Summer Olympics.

References

External links
 

1957 births
Living people
Italian male fencers
Olympic fencers of Italy
Fencers at the 1984 Summer Olympics
Fencers at the 1988 Summer Olympics
Olympic gold medalists for Italy
Olympic bronze medalists for Italy
Olympic medalists in fencing
Sportspeople from Padua
Medalists at the 1984 Summer Olympics
Medalists at the 1988 Summer Olympics
Universiade medalists in fencing
Universiade bronze medalists for Italy
Medalists at the 1983 Summer Universiade